Mount Martin may refer to:
 Mount Martin (Alaska), a stratovolcano in Alaska, United States
 Mount Martin (Antarctica), a mountain in Antarctica
 Mount Martin (British Columbia), a mountain in British Columbia, Canada
 Mount Martin (Yukon), a mountain in Yukon, Canada
 Mount Martin, Queensland, a town in Queensland, Australia
 Mont Martin in Quebec, Canada

See also
 Mount Martine
 Mount Martyn